Lou Dalfin is an Italian folk and folk-rock/folk-punk group focused on preserving and modernizing the traditions of Occitania.  Founded in 1982 by hurdy-gurdy master Sergio Berardo, the band combines traditional Occitan sounds with modern rock instrumentation.

Musicians
 Sergio Berardo - voice, ghironda
 Dino Tron - accordion, organetto, bag pipe
 Riccardo Serra - drums
 Gianluca Dho - bass
 Enrico Gosmar - guitar
 Luca Biggio - sax
 Mario Poletti - mandolin, bouzouki

Discography
 En franso i ero de grando guero (1982)
 L'aze d'alegre (1984)
 W Jan d' l'eiretto (1992)
 Gibous, Bagase e Bandí (1995)
 Radio Ousitania libra (1997)
 Lo viatge (1998)
 La flor de lo Dalfin (2001)
 Sem encar ici (2003)
 L’òste dal Diau (2004)
 L’òste dal Diau - International Version (2004)
 Al temps de festa en Occitania (DVD, 2005)
 I Virasolelhs (2007)
 Remescla (2009)
 Cavalier Faidit (2012)
 Musica Endemica (2016)

External links
  Official website
 Live in Turin

Italian musical groups
Occitan music